1,2,4-Trimethylbenzene, also known as pseudocumene, is an organic compound with the chemical formula CH(CH).  Classified as an aromatic hydrocarbon, it is a flammable colorless liquid with a strong odor. It is nearly insoluble in water but soluble in organic solvents. It occurs naturally in coal tar and petroleum (about 3%). It is one of the three isomers of trimethylbenzene.

Production
Industrially, it is isolated from the C aromatic hydrocarbon fraction during petroleum distillation. Approximately 40% of this fraction is 1,2,4-trimethylbenzene. It is also generated by methylation of toluene and xylenes and the disproportionation of xylene over aluminosilicate catalysts.

Uses
Pseudocumene is a precursor to mellitic anhydride, from which high performance polymers are made. It is also used as a sterilizing agent and in the making of dyes, perfumes and resins. Another use is as a gasoline additive.

Scintillator
1,2,4-Trimethylbenzene dissolved in mineral oil is used as a liquid scintillator in particle physics experiments such as NOνA and Borexino.

See also
 Cumene

References

External links
 EPA Chemical Fact Sheet
 CDC – NIOSH Pocket Guide to Chemical Hazards

Alkylbenzenes
C3-Benzenes